Middle Scots was the Anglic language of Lowland Scotland in the period from 1450 to 1700. By the end of the 15th century, its phonology, orthography, accidence, syntax and vocabulary had diverged markedly from Early Scots, which was virtually indistinguishable from early Northumbrian Middle English. Subsequently, the orthography of Middle Scots differed from that of the emerging Modern English standard. Middle Scots was fairly uniform throughout its many texts, albeit with some variation due to the use of Romance forms in translations from Latin or French, turns of phrases and grammar in recensions of southern texts influenced by southern forms, misunderstandings and mistakes made by foreign printers.

History 

The now established Stewart identification with the lowland language had finally secured the division of Scotland into two parts, the Gaelic Highlands and the Anglic Lowlands. The adherence of many Highlanders to the Catholic faith during the Reformation led to the 1609 Statutes of Iona forcing clan chiefs to establish Protestant churches, send their sons to Lowland schools and withdraw their patronage from the hereditary guardians of Gaelic culture – the bards. This was followed in 1616 by an act establishing parish schools in the Highlands with the aim of extirpating the Gaelic language.

The Danish dependency of Orkney and Shetland had been held by Scottish magnates from the late 14th century. These had introduced the Lowland tongue which then began to replace Norn. In 1467 the islands became part of Scotland.

By the early 16th century Scottis (previously used to describe Gaelic in Ireland as well as Scotland) had been adopted for what had become the national language of the Stewart kingdom. The term Erse (Irish) was used instead for Gaelic, while the previously used term Inglis was increasingly used to refer to the language south of the border. The first known instance of this terminology was by an unknown man in 1494. In 1559 William Nudrye was granted a monopoly by the court to produce school textbooks, two of which were Ane Schort Introduction: Elementary Digestit into Sevin Breve Tables for the Commodius Expeditioun of Thame That are Desirous to Read and Write the Scottis Toung and Ane Intructioun for Bairnis to be Learnit in Scottis and Latin but there is no evidence that the books were ever printed.

From 1610 to the 1690s, during the Plantation of Ulster, some 200,000 Scots settled in the north of Ireland, taking what were to become the Ulster Scots dialects with them.

Later in the period southern influence on the language increased, owing to the new political and social relations with England prior to and following the accession of James VI to the English throne. By the Union of Parliaments in 1707 southern Modern English was generally adopted as the literary language though Modern Scots remained the vernacular.

Orthography 

On the whole Middle Scots scribes never managed to establish a single standardised spelling for every word, but operated a system of free variation based on a number of spelling variants. Some scribes used their own variants, but this was relatively rare. The least variation occurred in the later 16th century as printers moved towards fixed spellings. This ended in the 17th century when printers began to adopt imported English conventions. Middle Scots used a number of now obsolete letters and letter
combinations:

 þ (thorn) was equivalent to the modern th as in thae. þ was often indistinguishable from the letter y and often written so.
 quh  was equivalent to the modern wh.
 sch was equivalent to the modern sh.
 A ligature of long s and short s (ſs, italic ſs), similar to German ß, is sometimes used for s (with variant readings like sis).
 The initial ff was a stylised single f.
The spelling -ys or -is also occurred in other words such as Inglis  and Scottis  . The older Scots spelling surviving in place names such as Fowlis , Glamis  and Wemyss .
 d after an n was often (and still is) silent i.e. barrand is  = barren.
 i and j were often interchanged.
 h was often silent.
 l after a and o had become vocalised and remained in use as an orthographic device to indicate vowel length. Hence the place names Balmalcolm , Falkirk , Kirkcaldy , Culross  and Culter .
 i after a vowel was also used to denote vowel length, e.g. ai , ei  oi  and ui .
 u, v and w were often interchanged.
 After -ch and -th, some scribes affixed a pleonastic final -t (-cht, -tht); this was unpronounced.
 The word ane represented the numeral ane as well as the indefinite article an and a, and was pronounced similar to Modern Scots usage. For example, Ane Satyre of the Thrie Estaitis was pronounced .

Phonology 

The development of Middle Scots vowels:

The Scottish Vowel Length Rule is assumed to have come into fruition between the early Middle Scots and late Middle Scots period. Here vowel length is conditioned by phonetic and morphemic environment.

Literature

Sample text  
This is an excerpt from Nicol Burne's anti-reformation pamphlet Of the praying in Latine (1581):

See also 

 History of the Scots language
 Phonological history of the Scots language
 Dictionary of the Scots Language

References

Further reading 

 A History of Scots to 1700 in A Dictionary of Older Scots Vol. 12. Oxford University Press 2002.
 Aitken, A.J. (1977) How to Pronounce Older Scots in Bards and Makars. Glasgow, Glasgow University Press.
Jones C. (ed) The Edinburgh History of the Scots Language, Edinburgh, University of Edinburgh Press.

External links 
 Scottish Language Dictionaries Ltd
 The Palaeography of Scottish Documents 1500 - 1750
 Reading Older Scots
 Teaching Package
 The Scottish Text Society

Scots
Scots language
Scots, Middle